Both during and after the American Civil War, pardons for ex-Confederates were given by US Presidents Abraham Lincoln and Andrew Johnson and were usually extended for those who had served in the military above the rank of colonel or civilians who had exercised political power under the Confederate government. The power to pardon offences to the US government was given to the chief executive in the US Constitution under Article II.

Abraham Lincoln
On December 8, 1863, in his annual message to Congress, President Lincoln outlined his plans for reconstruction of the South, which included terms for amnesty to former Confederates. A pardon would require an oath of allegiance, but it would not restore ownership to former slaves, or restore confiscated property which involved a third party. The pardon excluded office holders of the Confederate government or persons who had mistreated prisoners. Congress, however, objected to Lincoln's plans as being too lenient and refused to recognize delegates from the reconstructed governments of Louisiana and Arkansas. Congress instead passed the Wade–Davis Bill, which required half of any former Confederate state's voters to swear allegiance to the United States and also swear that they had not supported the Confederacy. The bill also ended slavery, but did not allow former slaves to vote. President Lincoln vetoed the bill. During his presidency Lincoln issued 64 pardons for war-related offences; 22 for conspiracy, 17 for treason, 12 for rebellion, 9 for holding an office under the Confederacy, and 4 for serving with the rebels.

Under the terms of surrender for the Army of Northern Virginia at Appomattox Court House on April 10, 1865, General Ulysses S. Grant stipulated that "each officer and man will be allowed to return to his home, not to be disturbed by United States authority so long as they observe their paroles and the laws in force where they may reside". On May 5 the parole was extended so that soldiers from the 11 Confederate states, plus West Virginia, would be allowed to return home on their paroles but that "all who claim homes in the District of Columbia and in States that never passed the Ordinance of Secession (Maryland, Kentucky, and Missouri included) have forfeited them and can only return thereto by complying with the Amnesty Proclamation of the president and obtaining special permission from the War Department".

Andrew Johnson
As Johnson assumed the presidency, his attitude toward Confederate leaders seemed to signify punishment and prosecution for the rebellion. Many southern leaders fled the United States, going to Mexico, Canada, Europe and other countries. He doubled the number of exempted classes that had been exempted by Lincoln. Johnson's proclamation of May 29, 1865, for example, did not include anyone whose personal property exceeded $20,000. Several mitigating factors however led Johnson to greater clemency, such as the attitude of Lincoln for reconciliation and William H. Seward's similar leniency towards the former rebels.

Those excluded from general amnesty had the option of applying to the president for a special pardon, and much of Johnson's time was spent in granting those pardons.

The following oath was required under Johnson's 1865 proclamation:

There were exceptions to the granting of general amnesty:

There were 12,652 pardons issued by June 5, 1866. Under Johnson's "thirteenth" exemption the number of pardons was issued in this order: Virginia, 2,070; Alabama, 1,361; Georgia 1,228; Mississippi, 765; South Carolina, 638; North Carolina, 482; Texas, 269; Louisiana, 142; Tennessee, 93; Arkansas, 41; West Virginia, 39; Florida, 22; Kentucky, 11; Missouri, 10.

On January 9, 1867, President Johnson sent Congress a list of high level former Confederates for whom he had issued pardons. The Nashville Telegraph and Union published a partial list of names, states, and causes for the pardons on January 13, 1867.

"Executive Clemency, A List of Prominent Confederates Pardoned by the President. The President sent to the House of Representatives on the 9th inst. a partial list of the Confederates who have been pardoned by him, and the parties upon whose recommendation they were pardoned. He states in his communication that there would not be time during the present session of Congress to make the list complete as called for by that body. The list embraces all of the more prominent cases in each of the Southern States, as follows:

Maryland
Frederick Chatard, rebel navy
Bradley T. Johnson, rebel brigadier general
George H. Steward , rebel major general
Colonel Andrew Cross Trippe, Army General.

District of Columbia
Twenty-five citizens, recommended by the mayors of Washington & Georgetown

Virginia
P.H. Aylett, attorney for Confederate States
Charles Brewer, surgeon, rebel service
Alex. R. Boteler, rebel M.C.
John M. Brooke, citizen
John R. Cambliss , rebel M.C.
James W. Cooke, rebel navy
R.R. Carter, rebel navy
London Campbell, rebel navy
John Debree, paymaster, rebel service
T.T. Fauntleroy, resigned commission in U.S. service
A.S. Garnett, surgeon, rebel service
W.D. Harrison, rebel navy
J.D. Henderson, ex-commander U.S. Navy
J.D. Halyburton, rebel judge
Edward Johnson, rebel general
R.W. Jeffrey, ex-surgeon U.S.N.
D.C. De Jarnette, rebel M.C.
James L. Kemper, rebel major general
F.W. Lynch, citizen
J.R.C. Lewis, rebel colonel
E.G. Lee, rebel brigadier general
James Lyons, rebel M.C.
H.H. Lewis, rebel navy
Wm. Leigh, ex-U.S.N.
P.T. Moore, rebel brigadier general
S.P. Moore, ex-surgeon U.S.N
W.H. McFarland, rebel M.C.
Fayette McMullen, rebel M.C.
Robert Ould, ex-U.S. district attorney
Hugh N. Page, rebel navy captain
R.L. Page, rebel brigadier general
R.B. Pegram, ex-U.S.N.
W.R. Staples, rebel M.C.
Geo. P. Scarborough, resigned judgeship
H.B. Taylor, ex-U.S. army
J.M. St. John, rebel brigadier general
Thomas S. Gholson, rebel M.C.
Charles E. Thorburne, rebel colonel
Wm. C. Wickham, rebel M.C.
W.C. Whittle, S.S. Lee, A.O. Browne, J.T. Mason, junior officers on the rebel privateer "Shenandoah"

West Virginia
A.T. Caperton, rebel senator
John Echols, rebel brigadier general
Charles J. Faulkner, rebel minister to France
Alexander C. Jones, rebel brigadier general
Robert Johnson , rebel M.C.
James T. Lockbridge, rebel M.C.
S.A. Miller, rebel M.C.
C.W. Russell, rebel M.C.
Joseph B. Washington, resigned from West Point

North Carolina
A.H. Arrington, rebel M.C.
Thomas S. Ashe, rebel M.C.
R. Barrenger , rebel brigadier general
William R. Cox, rebel brigadier general
William T. Dortch, rebel senator
Bryan Grimes, rebel brigadier general
Landon C. Haynes, rebel senator
Bradley T. Johnson, rebel brigadier general
J.M. Leach, rebel M.C.
Richard B. Lee, rebel lieutenant colonel
James R. McLean, rebel M.C.
Thomas D. McDowell, rebel M.C.
J.G. Ramsey , rebel M.C.
M.W. Ransom, rebel brigadier general
A.M. Seales, rebel brigadier general
A.W. Venable, rebel M.C.

South Carolina
Wm. Aiken, ex-governor
John D. Ashmore, resigned seat in the U.S. Congress
W.L. Bonham , rebel brigadier general
M. Butler, rebel brigadier general
John Bratton, rebel brigadier general
George Davis, rebel attorney general
Jesse J.D. DeBow, editor DeBow's Review
Stephen Elliott, Jr., rebel brigadier general
Walter Gwynn, rebel brigadier general
H.J. Harstene, ex-commander U.S. navy
John Hagood, rebel brigadier general
Duncan N. Ingraham, ex-captain U.S. navy
P.N. Lynch, Catholic bishop
J.L. Orr, rebel senator
G.S. Preston , rebel brigadier general
H.E. Smith, rebel senator
George A. Trenholm, secretary of the rebel treasury

Georgia
Clifford Anderson, rebel congressman
Joseph E. Brown, rebel governor of Georgia
Richard M. Cuyler, ex-U.S. naval officer
J.H. Echols, rebel congressman
Thomas M. Forman, rebel congressman
L.G. Gartrell , rebel brigadier general
H.W. Hilliard, resigned seat in U.S. Congress
H.R. Jackson, rebel brigadier general
Jno. J. Jones, resigned seat in U.S. Congress
L. McLaws, graduate of West Point, rebel brigadier general
E.A. Nisbet, rebel M.C.
Wm. E. Smith, rebel M.C.
Otho R. Singleton, rebel M.C.
J.H.W. Underwood , resigned seat in U.S. Congress

Florida
J.P. Anderson, rebel major general
A.K. Allison, rebel governor of Florida
James M. Baker, rebel M.C.
W.G.M. Davis, rebel major general
J.S. Finley , rebel brigadier general
A.E. Maxwell, rebel senator
J.P. Sanderson, rebel M.C.

Alabama
C.A. Battle, rebel brigadier general
Alpheus Baker, rebel brigadier general
David Clopton, resigned seat in U.S. Congress
W.P. Chilton, rebel M.C.
Thomas B. Cooper, rebel M.C.
F.M. Cockerill, rebel brigadier general
M.H. Cruikshank, rebel M.C.
J.M.L. Curry , rebel M.C.
H.D. Clayton, rebel major general
E.L. Dargan , rebel M.C.
Z.C. Deas, rebel brigadier general
E.E. Elmore , rebel assistant treasurer
W.H. Echols, graduate of West Point
T.G. Foster , rebel M.C.
Duff C. Green, rebel brigadier general
J.T. Holtzclare , rebel brigadier general
R. Jemison, Jr., rebel M.C.
Wm. G. Jones, ex-U.S. district judge
Wade Keyes, rebel attorney general
David P. Lewis, rebel M.C.
John T. Morgan, rebel brigadier general
Y.M. Moody, rebel brigadier general
Thomas B. Mills, resigned his commission in U.S. navy
E.W. Pettus, rebel brigadier general
James L. Pugh, resigned his seat in the U.S. Congress
P.D. Roddy , rebel brigadier general
John G. Shorter, ex-governor of Alabama
C.L. Sayre, ex-officer United States Marine Corps.
W.R. Smith, rebel M.C.
P.A. Watts , ex-governor of Alabama
S.A.M. Wood, rebel brigadier general

Tennessee
S.R. Anderson, rebel major general
J.D.C. Atkins, rebel congressman
A.S. Colyer , rebel congressman
R.L. Caruthers, rebel congressman
James W. McCallum, rebel congressman
M.A. Haynes, ex-U.S. army
G.A. Henry, rebel senator
George A. Howard, ex-U.S. Naval Academy
John P. Murray, rebel congressman
A.E. Jackson, rebel brigadier general
Thomas Meeness , rebel congressman
Geo. Maney, rebel brigadier general
J.B. Palmer, rebel brigadier general
Gideon J. Pillow, rebel brigadier general
C.W. Bell, rebel congressman
John L.T. Sneed, rebel congressman

In the list the designation "M.C." meant "member of Congress", though this sometimes referred to a state legislature rather than the Confederate Congress. A further list of names was sent by the President to the House on December 4, 1867.

In a final proclamation on December 25, 1868, Johnson declared "unconditionally, and without reservation, ... a full pardon and amnesty for the offence of treason against the United States, or of adhering to their enemies during the late civil war, with restoration of all rights, privileges, and immunities under the Constitution and the laws ..."

See also
List of people pardoned or granted clemency by the president of the United States

References

Further reading

External links

 Zebley, Kathleen Rosa, Rebel Salvation: The Story of Confederate Pardons, Doctoral Dissertation, Univ. of Tennessee Knoxville, 1998

1865 in American law
1866 in American law
1867 in American law
1868 in American law
Aftermath of the American Civil War
December 1868 events
History of the Confederate States of America
Presidency of Andrew Johnson
Ex-Confederates